Spas Gyurov is a Bulgarian road bicycle racer. He competed at the 2012 Summer Olympics in the Men's road race, but failed to finish.

Major results

2007
 1st  Road race, National Under-23 Road Championships
 3rd Road race
2009
 3rd Road race, National Road Championships
 5th H.H. Vice President Cup
 10th Tour of Vojvodina II 
2012
 2nd Time trial, National Road Championships
 5th Grand Prix Dobrich I
2013
 National Road Championships
1st  Time trial
3rd Road race
 2nd Overall Tour of Bulgaria
2020
 1st  Time trial, National Road Championships
2021
 National Road Championships
1st  Road race
2nd Time trial

References

Bulgarian male cyclists
Living people
Olympic cyclists of Bulgaria
Cyclists at the 2012 Summer Olympics
1986 births
Sportspeople from Pazardzhik